Colin d'Ornellas (2 May 1889 – 17 June 1934) was a cricketer from British Guiana. He played in five first-class matches for British Guiana from 1909 to 1912.

See also
 List of Guyanese representative cricketers

References

External links
 

1889 births
1934 deaths
Cricketers from British Guiana